Sleepy Hollow is a 1999 gothic supernatural horror film directed by Tim Burton. It is a film adaptation loosely based on Washington Irving's 1820 short story "The Legend of Sleepy Hollow", and stars Johnny Depp and Christina Ricci, with Miranda Richardson, Michael Gambon, Casper Van Dien, Christopher Lee and Jeffrey Jones in supporting roles. The plot follows police constable Ichabod Crane (Depp) sent from New York City to investigate a series of murders in the village of Sleepy Hollow by a mysterious Headless Horseman.

Development began in 1993 at Paramount Pictures, with Kevin Yagher originally set to direct Andrew Kevin Walker's script as a low-budget slasher film. Disagreements with Paramount resulted in Yagher being demoted to prosthetic makeup designer, and Burton was hired to direct in June 1998. Filming took place from November 1998 to May 1999. The film was an international co-production between Germany and the United States.

The film had its world premiere at Mann's Chinese Theatre on November 17, 1999, and was released in the United States on November 19, 1999, by Paramount Pictures. It received generally positive reviews from critics, with many praising the performances, direction, screenplay and musical score, as well as its dark humor, visual effects and atmosphere. It grossed approximately $207 million worldwide. Sleepy Hollow won the Academy Award for Best Art Direction.

Plot

In 1799, Ichabod Crane, a New York City police constable criticized for his predilection for scientific methods, is dispatched to the upstate Dutch hamlet of Sleepy Hollow, which has been plagued by a series of brutal decapitations: a wealthy father and his son, Peter and Dirk Van Garrett, and a widow, Emily Winship. Received by the insular town elders—wealthy businessman Baltus Van Tassel, town doctor Thomas Lancaster, the Reverend Steenwyck, notary James Hardenbrook, and magistrate Samuel Philipse—Ichabod learns that locals believe the killer is the undead apparition of a headless Hessian mercenary from the Revolutionary War who rides at nightfall on a black steed in search of his missing head.

Ichabod, however, is skeptical of the paranormal due to his family past. Boarding at the home of Baltus Van Tassel and his second wife, Lady Van Tassel, he is taken with Baltus' spiritual daughter, Katrina, from his first marriage. When a fourth victim, Jonathan Masbath, a servant in the Van Garrett household, is killed, Ichabod takes the victim's son, Young Masbath, under his wing. Ichabod and Masbath exhume the victims on a tip from Philipse, learning that the widow died pregnant. The Horseman decapitates Philipse next. Ichabod, Young Masbath, and Katrina venture into the Western Woods to look for the Horseman's grave. They find a witch living in a cave, who reveals that the Horseman's body lies under the "Tree of the Dead." Ichabod digs up the grave and discovers the skull has been taken, deducing it was stolen by someone who now commands the ghostly revenant, who comes into the world of the living through the tree and who will continue to take others' heads until his own is restored to him.

That night, the Horseman kills village midwife Beth Killian and her family, as well as Katrina's suitor Brom Van Brunt when he attempts to intervene; Ichabod is wounded by the Horseman, but survives. Ichabod hypothesizes the Horseman's targets are linked by a conspiracy. Notary Hardenbrook reveals that the first victim, Peter Van Garrett, had secretly married the widow Winship, writing a new will that left his estate to her and her unborn child. Ichabod deduces that all the victims (except Brom) were either beneficiaries or witnesses to this new will, and that the Horseman's master is the person who would have otherwise inherited the estate: Baltus, Van Garrett's closest relative.

Upon discovering the accusation, Katrina angrily burns the evidence. Hardenbrook commits suicide, and Reverend Steenwyck convokes a town meeting at the church to discredit Ichabod, but Baltus bursts in, announcing that the Horseman has killed Lady Van Tassel. The Horseman attacks the church, but is unable to enter. In the chaos, the remaining elders turn on each other; Steenwyck kills Lancaster and is in turn killed by Baltus, who is harpooned and decapitated by the Horseman.

Initially concluding that Katrina controls the Horseman, Ichabod discovers that the sigil she had drawn underneath his bed and in the church, which he believed summoned the Horseman, was really one of protection. He finds that a wound on "Lady Van Tassel's" decapitated body was caused post-mortem. Van Tassel, alive and well, reveals herself as the master of the Horseman. She faked her death and killed the Van Tassel's servant girl, Sarah, to plant her body as hers. She takes Katrina to the windmill, where she explains her true heritage. She and her twin sister were members of the impoverished Archer family who were evicted years ago by Peter Van Garrett, when he favored Baltus and his family instead. She swore revenge against Van Garrett and all who had wronged her family, pledging herself to Satan if he would raise the Horseman to avenge her by killing them, which would allow her to claim the Van Garrett and Van Tassel estates uncontested. Manipulating her way into the Van Tassel household, she used fear, blackmail, and lust to manipulate the other elders into her plot. Having eliminated all other heirs and witnesses, as well as her sister – the crone of the woods– for aiding Ichabod, she summons the Horseman to kill Katrina, the last person remaining in the way of her plans.

Ichabod and Masbath rush to the windmill as the Horseman arrives. After an escape that destroys the windmill and a subsequent chase to the Tree of the Dead, Ichabod retrieves the Horseman's skull from Van Tassel and returns it to him, breaking the curse and setting the Horseman free from Van Tassel's control. With his head restored, the Horseman spares Katrina and instead abducts Van Tassel, giving her a bloody kiss and returning to Hell via the Tree of the Dead with her in tow, fulfilling her end of the 'deal'. With the case solved, Ichabod returns to New York City with Katrina and Young Masbath, just in time for the new century.

Cast
 Johnny Depp as Ichabod Crane: Crane is a quirky, yet sympathetic constable infatuated with integrating modern science into police procedures (early forensic science), but is very squeamish at the sight of blood and bugs.
 Christina Ricci as Katrina Van Tassel: Ichabod's love interest and the only heir to one of the town's richest farmers. Ricci described her character as "a princess-y character, very one-sided, no emotional depth."
Miranda Richardson as Lady Mary Van Tassel (née Archer; she falsely uses "Preston" as her maiden name): The aloof wife of Baltus and stepmother of Katrina, who is revealed to be a vengeful witch. Richardson also portrays the Crone Witch, Lady Van Tassel's sister.
 Michael Gambon as Baltus Van Tassel: Katrina's father. After Peter Van Garrett is murdered, he is placed as the leader of the town.
 Casper Van Dien as Brom Van Brunt: A strong and arrogant aristocratic man who is romantically involved with Katrina. 
 Jeffrey Jones as Reverend Steenwyck: The austere, corrupt town pastor.
 Christopher Lee as the Burgomaster.
 Richard Griffiths as Magistrate Samuel Philipse: The drunken town magistrate. 
 Ian McDiarmid as Dr. Thomas Lancaster: The town doctor and surgeon.
 Michael Gough as Notary James Hardenbrook: The wizened, cowardly town banker.
 Marc Pickering as Young Masbath: An orphan who looks towards Ichabod as a father figure after his father is slain by the Horseman.
 Lisa Marie as Lady Crane (in flashbacks): Ichabod's mother who practiced benign witchcraft, for which she was killed by her strict religious husband.
 Steven Waddington as Mr. Killian
 Ray Park and Christopher Walken as the Headless Horseman: A brutal and sadistic Hessian mercenary sent to America during the American Revolutionary War who loses his head during battle. Walken portrays the Hessian while Park performs the Headless Horseman.
 Claire Skinner as Beth Killian: The town midwife.
 Alun Armstrong as the High Constable
 Mark Spalding as Jonathan Masbath
 Jessica Oyelowo as Sarah
 Tony Maudsley as Van Ripper
 Peter Guinness as Lord Crane (in flashbacks): Ichabod's devoutly religious father who tortured and killed his wife for practicing witchcraft.
 Sean Stephens as Thomas Killian
Other roles include Michael Feast as Spotty Man, Jamie Foreman as Thuggish Constable, Philip Martin Brown as a Constable, and an uncredited Martin Landau as Peter Van Garrett, Sleepy Hollow's chief citizen until his death at the hands of the Headless Horseman.

Production

Development
In 1993, Kevin Yagher, a make-up effects designer who had turned to directing with Tales from the Crypt, had the notion to adapt Washington Irving's short story "The Legend of Sleepy Hollow" into a feature film. Through his agent, Yagher was introduced to Andrew Kevin Walker; they spent a few months working on a film treatment that transformed Ichabod Crane from a schoolmaster from Connecticut to a banished New York City detective. Yagher and Walker subsequently pitched Sleepy Hollow to various studios and production companies, eventually securing a deal with producer Scott Rudin, who had been impressed with Walker's unproduced spec script for Seven. Rudin optioned the project to Paramount Pictures in a deal that had Yagher set to direct, with Walker scripting; the pair would share story credit. Following the completion of Hellraiser: Bloodline, Yagher had planned Sleepy Hollow as a low-budget production—"a pretentious slasher film with a spectacular murder every five minutes or so." Paramount disagreed on the concept and demoted Yagher's involvement to prosthetic makeup designer. "They never really saw it as a commercial movie," producer Adam Schroeder noted. "The studio thinks 'old literary classic' and they think The Crucible. We started developing it before horror movies came back."

Paramount CEO Sherry Lansing revived studio interest in 1998. Schroeder, who shepherded Tim Burton's Edward Scissorhands as a studio executive at 20th Century Fox in 1990, suggested that Burton direct the film. Francis Ford Coppola's minimal production duties came from American Zoetrope; Burton only became aware of Coppola's involvement during the editing process when he was sent a copy of Sleepy Hollows trailer and saw Coppola's name on it. Burton, coming off the troubled production of Superman Lives, was hired to direct in June 1998. "I had never really done something that was more of a horror film," he explained, "and it's funny, because those are the kind of movies that I like probably more than any other genre." His interest in directing a horror film influenced by his love for Hammer Film Productions and Black Sunday—particularly the supernatural feel they evoked as a result of being filmed primarily on sound stages. As a result, Sleepy Hollow is a homage to various Hammer Film Productions, including Dr. Jekyll and Sister Hyde, and other films such as Frankenstein, Bride of Frankenstein, various Roger Corman horror films, Jason and the Argonauts, and Scream Blacula Scream. The image of the Headless Horseman had fascinated Burton during his apprenticeship as a Disney animator at CalArts in the early 1980s. "One of my teachers had worked on the Disney version as one of the layout artists on the chase, and he brought in some layouts from it, so that was exciting. It was one of the things that maybe shaped what I like to do." Burton worked with Walker on rewrites, but Rudin suggested that Tom Stoppard rewrite the script to add to the comical aspects of Ichabod's bumbling mannerisms, and emphasize the character's romance with Katrina. His work went uncredited through the WGA screenwriting credit system.

While Johnny Depp was Burton's first choice for the role of Ichabod Crane, Paramount required him to consider Brad Pitt, Liam Neeson and Daniel Day-Lewis. Depp was cast in July 1998 for his third collaboration with Burton. The actor wanted Ichabod to parallel Irving's description of the character in the short story. This included a long prosthetic snipe nose, huge ears, and elongated fingers. Paramount turned down his suggestions, and after Depp read Tom Stoppard's rewrite of the script, he was inspired to take the character even further. "I always thought of Ichabod as a very delicate, fragile person who was maybe a little too in touch with his feminine side, like a frightened little girl," Depp explained. He did not wish to portray the character as a typical action star would have, and instead took inspiration by Angela Lansbury's performance in Death on the Nile. "It's good," Burton reasoned, "because I'm not the greatest action director, or the greatest director in any genre, and he's not the greatest action star, or the greatest star in any genre." Depp modeled Ichabod's detective personality from Basil Rathbone in the 1939 Sherlock Holmes film series. He also studied Roddy McDowall's acting for additional influence. Burton added that "the idea was to try to find an elegance in action of the kind that Christopher Lee or Peter Cushing or Vincent Price had." Sleepy Hollow also reunited Burton with Jeffrey Jones (from Beetlejuice and Ed Wood) as Reverend Steenwyck, Christopher Walken (Max Shreck in Batman Returns) as the Hessian Horseman, Martin Landau (Ed Wood) in a cameo role, and Hammer veteran Michael Gough (Alfred in Burton's Batman films), whom Burton tempted out of retirement. The Hammer influence was further confirmed by the casting of Christopher Lee in a small role as the Burgomaster who sends Crane to Sleepy Hollow.

Filming

The original intention had been to shoot Sleepy Hollow predominantly on location with a $30 million budget. Towns were scouted throughout Upstate New York along the Hudson Valley, and the filmmakers decided on Tarrytown for an October 1998 start date. The Historic Hudson Valley organization assisted in scouting locations, which included the Philipsburg Manor House and forests in the Rockefeller State Park Preserve. "They had a wonderful quality to them," production designer Rick Heinrichs reflected on the locations, "but it wasn't quite lending itself to the sort of expressionism that we were going for, which wanted to express the feeling of foreboding." Disappointed, the filmmakers scouted locations in Sturbridge, Massachusetts, and considered using Dutch colonial villages and period town recreations in the Northeastern United States. When no suitable existing location could be found, coupled with a lack of readily available studio space in the New York area needed to house the production's large number of sets, producer Scott Rudin suggested the UK.

Rudin believed Britain offered the level of craftsmanship in period detail, painting and costuming that was suitable for the film's design. Having directed Batman entirely in Britain, Burton agreed, and designers from Batmans art department were employed by Paramount for Sleepy Hollow. As a result, principal photography was pushed back to November 20, 1998, at Leavesden Film Studios, which had been recently vacated by Star Wars: Episode I – The Phantom Menace. The majority of filming took place at Leavesden, with studio other work at Shepperton Studios, where the massive Tree of the Dead set was built using Stage H. Production then moved to the Culden Faw Estate, Hambleden for a month-long shoot in March, where the town of Sleepy Hollow was constructed. "We came to England figuring we would find a perfect little town," producer Adam Schroeder recalled, "and then we had to build it anyway." Filming in Britain continued through April, and a few last minute scenes were shot using a sound stage in Yonkers, New York the following May.

Design

Responsible for the film's production design was Rick Heinrichs, whom Burton intended to use on Superman Lives. While the production crew was always going to build a substantial number of sets, the decision was made early on that optimally fulfilling Burton's vision would necessitate shooting Sleepy Hollow in a totally controlled environment at Leavesden Film Studios. The production design was influenced by Burton's love for Hammer Film Productions and the film Black Sunday (1960)—particularly the supernatural feel they evoked as a result of being filmed primarily on sound stages. Heinrichs was also influenced by American colonial architecture, German Expressionism, Dr. Seuss illustrations, and Hammer's Dracula Has Risen from the Grave.

One sound stage at Leavesden was dedicated to the "Forest to Field" set, for the scene in which the Headless Horseman races out of the woods and into a field. This stage was then transformed into, variously, a graveyard, a corn field, a field of harvested wheat, a churchyard, and a snowy battlefield. In addition, a small backlot area was devoted to a New York City street and waterfront tank.

Cinematography
Burton was impressed by the cinematography in Great Expectations (1998) and hired Emmanuel Lubezki as Sleepy Hollows director of photography. Initially, Lubezki and Burton contemplated shooting the film in black and white, and in old square Academy ratio. When that proved unfeasible, they opted for an almost monochromatic effect which would enhance the fantasy aspect. Burton and Lubezki intentionally planned the over-dependency of smoke and soft lighting to accompany the film's sole wide-angle lens strategy. Lubezki also used Hammer horror and Mexican lucha films from the 1960s, such as Santo Contra los Zombis and Santo vs. las Mujeres Vampiro. Lighting effects increased the dynamic energy of the Headless Horseman, while the contrast of the film stock was increased in post-production to add to the monochromatic feel.

Leavesden Studios, a converted airplane factory, presented problems because of its relatively low ceilings. This was less of an issue for The Phantom Menace, in which set height was generally achieved by digital means. "Our visual choices get channeled and violent," Heinrichs elaborated, "so you end up with liabilities that you tend to exploit as virtues. When you've got a certain ceiling height, and you're dealing with painted backings, you need to push atmosphere and diffusion." This was particularly the case in several exteriors that were built on sound stages. "We would mitigate the disadvantages by hiding lights with teasers and smoke."

Visual effects
The majority of Sleepy Hollows 150 visual effects shots were handled by Industrial Light & Magic (ILM), while Kevin Yagher supervised the human and creature effects. Framestore also assisted on digital effects, and The Mill handled motion control photography. In part a reaction to the computer-generated effects in Mars Attacks!, Burton opted to use as limited an amount of digital effects as possible. Ray Park, who served as the Headless Horseman stunt double, wore a blue ski mask for the chroma key effect, digitally removed by ILM. Burton and Heinrichs applied to Sleepy Hollow many of the techniques they had used in stop motion animation on Vincent—such as forced perspective sets.

The windmill was a 60-foot-tall forced-perspective exterior (visible to highway travellers miles away), a base and rooftop set and a quarter-scale miniature. The interior of the mill, which was about 30 feet high and 25 feet wide, featured wooden gears equipped with mechanisms for grinding flour. A wider view of the windmill was rendered on a Leavesden soundstage set with a quarter-scale windmill, complete with rotating vanes, painted sky backdrop and special-effects fire. "It was scary for the actors who were having burning wood explode at them," Heinrichs recalled. "There were controls in place and people standing by with hoses, of course, but there's always a chance of something going wrong." For the final shot of the burning mill exploding, the quarter-scale windmill and painted backdrop were erected against the outside wall of the "flight shed", a spacious hangar on the far side of Leavesden Studios. The hangar's interior walls were knocked down to create a 450-foot run, with a 40-foot width still allowing for coach and cameras. Heinrichs tailored the sets so cinematographer Emmanuel Lubezki could shoot from above without seeing the end of the stage.

Actor Ian McDiarmid, who portrayed Dr. Lancaster, had just finished another Leavesden production with Star Wars: Episode I – The Phantom Menace. He compared the aesthetics of the two films, stating that physical sets helped the actors get into a natural frame of mind. "Having come from the blue-screen world of Star Wars it was wonderful to see gigantic, beautifully made perspective sets and wonderful clothes, and also people recreating a world. It's like the way movies used to be done"

Musical score

The film score was written and produced by Danny Elfman. It won the Golden Satellite Award and was also nominated by the Las Vegas Film Critics.

Release
To promote Sleepy Hollow, Paramount Pictures featured the film's trailer at San Diego Comic-Con International in August 1999. The following October, the studio launched a website, which Variety described as being the "most ambitious online launch of a motion picture to date." The site (sleepyhollowmovie.com) offered visitors live video chats with several of the filmmakers hosted by Yahoo! Movies and enabled them to send postcards, view photos, trailers and a six-minute behind-the-scenes featurette edited from a broadcast that aired on Entertainment Tonight. Extensive tours of 10 sets were offered, where visitors were able to roam around photographs, including the sets for the entire town of Sleepy Hollow, forest, church, graveyard and covered bridge. Arthur Cohen, president of worldwide marketing for Paramount, explained that the "Web-friendly" pre-release reports from websites such as Ain't It Cool News and Dark Horizons encouraged the studio to create the site. In the weeks pre-dating the release of Sleepy Hollow, a toy line was marketed by McFarlane Toys. Simon & Schuster also published The Art of Sleepy Hollow, which included the film's screenplay and an introduction by Tim Burton. A novelization, also published by Simon & Schuster, was written by Peter Lerangis.

Sleepy Hollow was released in the United States on November 19, 1999, in 3,069 theaters, grossing $30,060,467 in its opening weekend at the No. 2 spot behind The World Is Not Enough. Sleepy Hollow eventually earned $101,068,340 in domestic gross, and $106 million in foreign sales, coming to a worldwide total of $207,068,340.

Paramount Home Video first released Sleepy Hollow on DVD in the United States on May 23, 2000. The HD DVD release came in July 2006, while the film was released on Blu-ray Disc two years later, in June 2008.
An unofficial video game adaptation of the film titled Cursed Fates: The Headless Horseman was released by Fenomen Games and Big Fish Games on January 6, 2013. For the 20th anniversary, Paramount Home Entertainment released a Blu-ray digibook with a photobook containing the original story on September 24, 2019.

Reception
Film review aggregator Rotten Tomatoes reports that 70% of critics gave the film a positive review based on 123 reviews with an average rating of 6.3/10. The site's critics consensus states, "It isn't Tim Burton's best work, but Sleepy Hollow entertains with its stunning visuals and creepy atmosphere." Metacritic, another review aggregator, assigned the film a weighted average score of 65 out of 100 based on 35 reviews from mainstream critics, considered to be "generally favorable". Audiences polled by CinemaScore gave the film an average grade of "B−" on an A+ to F scale.

Roger Ebert praised Johnny Depp's performance and Tim Burton's methods of visual design. "Johnny Depp is an actor able to disappear into characters," Ebert continued, "never more readily than in one of Burton's films." Richard Corliss wrote, in his review for Time, "Burton's richest, prettiest, weirdest [film] since Batman Returns. The simple story bends to his twists, freeing him for an exercise in high style."

David Sterritt of The Christian Science Monitor highly praised Burton's filmmaking and the high-spirited acting of cast, but believed Andrew Kevin Walker's writing was too repetitious and formulaic for the third act.

Owen Gleiberman from Entertainment Weekly wrote Sleepy Hollow is "a choppily plotted crowd-pleaser that lacks the seductive, freakazoid alchemy of Burton's best work." Gleiberman compared the film to The Mummy, and said "it feels like every high-powered action climax of the last 10 years. Personally, I'd rather see Burton so intoxicated by a movie that he lost his head."

Andrew Johnston of Time Out New York wrote: "Like the best of Burton's films, Sleepy Hollow takes place in a world so richly imagined that, despite its abundant terrors, you can't help wanting to step through the screen."

Mick LaSalle, writing in the San Francisco Chronicle, criticized Burton's perceived image as a creative artist. "All Sleepy Hollow has going for it is art direction, and even in that it falls back on cliché."

Doug Walker linked the film to the Hammer Films style of horror cinematography, considering it an homage to those movies, comparing the usage of dignified British actors, choices in color and movie sets and character relations. Walker gave it the merit of recreating the "very specific genre" of Hammer Films, citing the skill and "clever casting" Burton used to manage this.

Jonathan Rosenbaum from the Chicago Reader called Sleepy Hollow "a ravishing visual experience, a pretty good vehicle for some talented American and English actors," but concluded that the film was a missed opportunity to depict an actual representation of the short story. "Burton's fidelity is exclusively to the period feeling he gets from disreputable Hammer horror films and a few images culled from Ichabod and Mr. Toad. When it comes to one of America's great stories, Burton obviously couldn't care less."

Accolades

Reboot
On June 10, 2022, Paramount has developed the reboot of Sleepy Hollow with Lindsey Beer planned to write and direct it.

See also

 Sleepy Hollow (TV series)
 List of ghost films

References

Further reading

External links

 
 
 
 
 
 
 Tim Burton interview by Charlie Rose
 
 
 The sword from “Sleepy Hollow” 

1999 films
1999 horror films
1990s English-language films
1990s ghost films
1990s mystery films
1990s police films
1990s serial killer films
1990s supernatural horror films
American films about revenge
American dark fantasy films
American ghost films
American mystery horror films
American police detective films
American serial killer films
American slasher films
American splatter films
American supernatural horror films
American Zoetrope films
BAFTA winners (films)
Crime horror films
German fantasy films
German ghost films
German horror films
German mystery films
German slasher films
German supernatural horror films
Films set in 1799
Films about witchcraft
Films based on The Legend of Sleepy Hollow
Films directed by Tim Burton
Films produced by Scott Rudin
Films scored by Danny Elfman
Films set in Manhattan
Films set in Westchester County, New York
Films shot at Shepperton Studios
Films shot at Warner Bros. Studios, Leavesden
Films whose art director won the Best Art Direction Academy Award
Films with screenplays by Andrew Kevin Walker
Folk horror films
Gaslamp fantasy
Gothic horror films
Grave-robbing in film
Hell in popular culture
Mandalay Pictures films
Paramount Pictures films
Period horror films
Romantic period films
Sororicide in fiction
Supernatural slasher films
Uxoricide in fiction
Films about inheritances
1990s American films
1990s German films